Ivan Ladislav Galeta (9 May 1947 – 7 January 2014) was a Croatian multimedia artist, cinematographer and film director.

Biography

Galeta lived in Kraj Gornji, where he performed his Endart projects, and worked at the Academy of Fine Arts in Zagreb. He graduated from Zagreb's School of Applied Arts and Design (Department of Applied Graphics) (1967), at the teacher training college in Zagreb (1969), and at the studies of pedagogy sciences at the Faculty of Philosophy in Zagreb (1981). In the last few years he created pieces of internet art.

Filmography 
 WAL(L)ZEN (1989), 35 mm
 Water Pulu 1869 1896(1988), 35 mm
 Two Times in One Space(1985), 35 mm
 PiRâMidas 1972-1984 (1984), 35 mm
 sfaira 1985-1895 (1984), 35 mm

Videography 
 TV ping-pong (1975/78)
 Video radovi / Video works (1977/78)
 Media Game 1 (1978)
 Drop (1979)
 Railway station – Amsterdam (1979)
 Lijnbaangracht Centrum (1979)
 No 1, 2,3,4 (1979)
 Post Card (1983)
 Pismo / Letter (1995)
 Endart No 1 (2000)
 Endart No 2 (2001)
 Endart No 3 (2003)
 Endart No 4 (2004)

References 

UNDERCUT Number 18 Autumn 1989 page 48-51 
SCCA Bio 
Ladislav Galeta – Obsession: Structuring Time and Space by Georg Schöllhammer
Ivan Ladislav Galeta: Point Zero Landscape, Experiments and Research
Ivan Ladislav Galeta retrospective

External links 
 
 Official page
 Noart Earth Day
 Bio

1947 births
2014 deaths
People from Vinkovci
Croatian experimental filmmakers
Croatian video artists
Croatian contemporary artists
Installation artists
Vladimir Nazor Award winners